Weston Rhyn railway station was a minor station on the Great Western Railway's London to Birkenhead main line serving the villages of Weston Rhyn and Preesgweene in England. It had an adjacent signal box and level crossing and immediately to the south were Up & Down Goods Loops. It had originally opened as Preesgweene (or Presgwyn?) and closed for the first time in March 1855. It re-opened as Preesgweene in November 1871 and was renamed Weston Rhyn in February 1935 It closed in 1960 but the railway is still open today as part of the Shrewsbury to Chester Line.
After closure the platforms were removed but the station building was converted to a private residence.

Historical services
Express trains did not call there and it would have been served by West Midlands & Shrewsbury to Wrexham & Chester local trains; typically about half a dozen trains a day.

According to the Official Handbook of Stations the following classes of traffic were being handled at this station in 1956: G, P and there was no crane. Additionally, the National Coal Board had sidings on the east side of the line serving Ifton colliery.

References

Further reading

External links
 Weston Rhyn station on navigable 1946 O.S. map

Disused railway stations in Shropshire
Former Great Western Railway stations
Railway stations in Great Britain opened in 1848
Railway stations in Great Britain closed in 1960